Kalle Kustaa Tuulos (15 May 1930 — 4 March 2001) was a Finnish figure skater. Competing in single skating, he was an eight-time Finnish national champion (1949–56) representing Tampereen Luistelijat of Tampere. Sent to two Winter Olympics, Tuulos placed 13th in 1952 (Oslo) and 15th in 1956 (Cortina d'Ampezzo). He was the nephew of Vilho Tuulos.

Competitive highlights

References 

1930 births
2001 deaths
Finnish male single skaters
Sportspeople from Tampere
Figure skaters at the 1952 Winter Olympics
Figure skaters at the 1956 Winter Olympics
Olympic figure skaters of Finland
20th-century Finnish people
21st-century Finnish people